Fresson may refer to:

Bernard Fresson (1931–2002), French actor primarily in film
E. E. Fresson, OBE (1891–1963), ("Ted" Fresson), British engineer and aviation pioneer
Max Fresson (1912–1996), French equestrian
Théodore-Henri Fresson (1865–1951), agronomist

See also
Project Fresson, the development by Cranfield Aerospace of an electric propulsion system
Frasson
Frisson